Autumn Crocus is a 1934 British romance film directed by Basil Dean and starring Ivor Novello, Fay Compton and Muriel Aked. The film follows a teacher who falls in love with the married owner of the guest house in which she is staying during a holiday to Austria. It was based on Dodie Smith's first play Autumn Crocus, previously a West End hit for director Basil Dean. The film was made by Associated Talking Pictures at Ealing Studios, with art direction by Edward Carrick. It was the final film appearance of its star, Ivor Novello. A contemporary reviewer wrote, "Novello's schoolboy knees under his Tyrolean shorts make the audience, if not the players, feel bashful".

Cast
 Ivor Novello as Andreas Steiner 
 Fay Compton as Jenny Grey 
 Muriel Aked as Miss Mayne 
 Esme Church as Edith 
 Frederick Ranalow as Herr Feldmann 
 Jack Hawkins as Alaric 
 Diana Beaumont as Audrey 
 Mignon O'Doherty as Frau Feldmann 
 George Zucco as Reverend Mayne 
 Gertrude Gould as Frau Steiner 
 Alyce Sandor as Minna
 Pamela Blake as Lenchen

Reception
The New York Times reviewer wrote, "the wistful romance of the fading English schoolmistress and the cheerful Tyrolean inn-keeper drags in its telling, and this in the face of the presence of Fay Compton and Ivor Novello in the principal rôles and of Basil Dean's direction". The critic felt that Compton overacted, surprising since she played the role on stage for more than sixty weeks, in contrast to "the performances of Mr. Novello, Muriel Aked and Esme Church, who did well, indeed." Still, the reviewer felt that Autumn Crocus "has a delicate charm, is handsomely photographed and presents a refreshingly different solution to a problem that would have had Hollywood's script-writers dashing madly in all directions."

References

Bibliography
 Low, Rachael. Filmmaking in 1930s Britain. George Allen & Unwin, 1985.
 Perry, George. Forever Ealing. Pavilion Books, 1994.

External links
 

1930s romance films
1934 films
British romance films
Films directed by Basil Dean
Films set in Austria
British films based on plays
Associated Talking Pictures
Films set in hotels
Films about vacationing
British black-and-white films
Films based on works by Dodie Smith
1930s English-language films
1930s British films